Monthuchon is a commune in the Manche department in Normandy in northwestern France, about 5 km north of Coutances.

It is located on the main D971 road from Périers to Coutances, at the south of the Cherbourg peninsular.

The parish church, dedicated to St Martin, dates back to the 16th century.

Leon Legrand, the former Prefect of Wallis and Futuna, was born in Monthuchon.

See also
Communes of the Manche department

References

Communes of Manche